Loznik is a village in the municipality of Visoko, Bosnia and Herzegovina.

Demographics 
According to the 2013 census, its population was 463.

References

Populated places in Visoko